Giovanni di Fonsalida (died 1498) was a Roman Catholic prelate who served as Bishop of Terni (1494–1498).

Biography
On 1 October 1494, Giovanni di Fonsalida was appointed by Pope Alexander VI as Bishop of Terni. 
He served as Bishop of Terni until his death in 1498.

References

External links and additional sources
 (for Chronology of Bishops) 
 (for Chronology of Bishops) 

15th-century Italian Roman Catholic bishops
1485 deaths
Bishops appointed by Pope Alexander VI